Ruth Beckett may refer to:

Vinton Ruth Beckett (1923–2018), Jamaican female high jumper
Ruth Beckett, fictional character in British television drama Threads